Daman district , is one of the four districts of the Indian union territory of Dadra and Nagar Haveli and Daman and Diu by the west coast of India, surrounded by Valsad district of Gujarat state on the north, east and south and the Arabian Sea to the west. The district headquarters is Daman. The previous territorial headquarters were in Panjim when it was jointly administered as Goa, Damaon& Diu until the time of the Konkani language agitation.

Daman lies at the mouth of the Daman Ganga River.  Major industries have units here. The closest railway station is Vapi (7 km). It is also famous for its beach, Portuguese colonial architecture, churches, and for the scenic beauty in the twin towns of Nani-Daman and Moti-Daman, which lie opposite each other across the Daman Ganga. The city of Surat lies to the north, and Bombay (Mumbai) lies approximately 160 km (100 mi) to the south in the Konkan division of Maharashtri.

History

The edict of the Emperor Ashoka (273 to 136 BC) was found in Saurashtra and Sopara near Bombay. Satrya Kshatrapas under the Kushana emperor seemed to have ruled over Daman District during the 1st century, AD. The coins of Bhumaka and Nahapan, the kshaharata rulers were discovered in the surrounding areas of Surat District. Ushavadatta, son-in-law of Nahapan, is said to have provided ferries on rivers Dhanuha Dhamana, Parada and Tapi.

This is the earliest reference of these rivers and the names of the places, i.e. Dahanu, Daman and Pardi, remained unchanged for the last 2000 years. The District seems to have been subjected to the rule of Gautamaputra Satakarnin, about 125 AD, who drove away the Kshaharatas. But Satavahana's rule was short lived.

Rudraman I, grandson of Chastan of Kadamaka branch of Kshatrapas reconquered a large part of Western India including the seaboard from the river Mahi in Gujarat to Ratnagiri by about 150 AD from Satavahana ruler, Satakarni, and Daman district again passed under the rule of Kshatrapa Vijayasen (234-239 AD) who seems to have ruled over the district till 249 AD. Abhir king Ishwarasena of Nasik, who conquered the western part of the Deccan from the Satavahanas seems to have been laid by Gautamaputra Yajnashri, campaigns the Kshatrapas from 180 to 200 AD.

The District seems to have been subjected to the rule of traikutakas during the 5th century, AD. The Lata Country was ruled by Rashtrakutas of Malkhed in the Deccan directly till 808 by the successors, Govinda II (575- 795 AD), Druvaraja - I (795-800) and Govinda III (800-808).

Govinda III handed over the Lata kingdom to his brother Indra about 808 and was given the title Lateswaramandalasya or the protector of Latamandala. Indra was succeeded by his son Karka who seems to have ruled Latamandala with his brother, Govinda jointly till 826. Druva II, son of Karka came to the throne about 835 and was succeeded by Akalavarsha in 867. The District was passed to Tailappa II of the Chalupas of Kalyani in 973. Tailappa II placed Lata Country in the hands of his relative and general Barrpa alias Dvarappa Chalukya. By the middle of the 13th century, a Rajput prince Ramsingh alias Ramashah seems to have defeated the koli chief Nathorat and established himself in the hilly tract at Asheri of Asserseta near Daman about 1262. Ramsingh was succeeded by his son Somanath in 1295. The newly founded Ramnagar at the foot of the ghats flourished under Somnath (1335-1360) and Daram shah (1360-1391). Jagatshah succeeded Gopushah and ruled during 1432 to 1470. The Portuguese from Shah of Gujarat acquired Daman. They noticed the port of Daman for the first time in 1523. A Portuguese enclave for four centuries and a half till the close of the colonial rule in 1961; Daman has been a coveted prize for which princes, monarchs and alien powers waged wars. Muted memories of history lie vaulted in the monuments of Daman. It had been a melting pot, where races and cultures met and mixed to bring forth a multi-coloured identity.

Daman was occupied by the Portuguese in 1531, and was formally ceded to Portugal in 1539 by the Sultan of Gujarat.

Mirroring the system of administrative division in European Portugal, Daman district (Distrito de Damão) was established as an administrative division of the Portuguese State of India (Estado da Índia) in the first half of the 19th century. The District was made up of the Portuguese territories of Daman, Dadra and Nagar Haveli. It was headed by a district governor, subordinate to the governor-general of Portuguese India in Goa. The district was divided in the two municipalities of Daman and Nagar Haveli, which were further subdivided into civil parishes.

The Dadra and Nagar Haveli landlocked parts of the Daman district were occupied by pro-Indian Union forces in 1954. In 1961, Dadra and Nagar Haveli was officially annexed by India, forming a union territory separated from Daman.

The rest of the District remained under Portuguese rule until it was annexed by Indian forces on 19 December 1961. From 1961 to 1987, it was a part of the union territory of Goa, Daman and Diu. In 1987, it became a part of the newly formed union territory of Daman and Diu.

On 3 November 2019, Daman Collector  Rakesh Minhas issued a Section 144 order banning peaceful assembly of four or more persons, slogan-shouting and the use of loudspeakers across the entire district and ordered the conversion of  High School, Bhimpore and the Sarvottam High School, Moti Daman into 'temporary jails'. This was in response to a land ownership dispute between the local indigenous fishing community and the local administration that had confiscated their land and bulldozed their homes. The ensuing 2019 Daman Indigenous Land Clearing Protests resulted with the detention of 70 protesters in the 'temporary jails' and another 8 arrests. Few of the adivasi fisherfolk were rehoused whilst most languished traumatised and homeless on the streets near the rubble of their razed homes.

Divisions
Daman district has only one tehsil - Daman. The territory of the whole district is part of Daman and Diu Lok Sabha constituency.

Demographics
The district is infamous for having the least balanced sex ratio in the country. According to the 2011 census Daman District, India has a population of 191,173, roughly equal to the nation of Samoa. This gives it a ranking of 592nd in India (out of a total of 640). Its population growth rate over the decade 2001-2011 was  69.256%. Daman has a sex ratio of 533 females for every 1,000 males, and a literacy rate of 88.06%.

Transport
Daman is connected by roads and is 12 km from Vapi, 125 km from Surat, and 195 km from Mumbai. Vapi railway station on the Western Railway is the station nearest to Daman, and connects to all major cities. Daman Airport has a Coast Guard air base.

A bridge over the Daman Ganga between Moti Daman and Nani Daman collapsed during a monsoon on 28 August 2003, killing 27 school children and one teacher when their vehicles plunged into the river.  A new bridge was constructed at a cost of about 90 million rupees, but that partially collapsed in August 2004. No casualties occurred. The collapse was attributed to heavy flooding on river Damanganga.
Now the new bridge, known as Rajeev Gandhi Setu for Heavy Vehicles, has been completed, and the old bridges are to be kept closed forever.

Education 
In Daman, the most popular schools are Divya Jyoti English Higher Secondary School, Institute of Our Lady of Fátima located in Moti Daman, Coast Guard Public School in Nani Daman, Sarvajanik Vidyalaya in Nani Daman, Shri Macchi Mahajan High School in Nani Daman, and other government institutions. There is also a college named Government College, Daman which has most of the educational facilities.

Sister cities 
Daman is a twin town of the city of Coimbra, Portugal.

References

Further reading
 Andrada (undated). The Life of Dom John de Castro: The Fourth Vice Roy of India. Jacinto Freire de Andrada. Translated into English by Peter Wyche. (1664). Henry Herrington, New Exchange, London. Facsimile edition (1994) AES Reprint, New Delhi. .

External links
Government of the Union Territory of Daman and Diu
Daman District Administration 

 
Districts of Dadra and Nagar Haveli and Daman and Diu